Gordonsville is an unincorporated community in Logan County, Kentucky, in the United States.

History
A post office was established at Gordonsville in 1848, and remained in operation until it was discontinued in 1933. Gordonsville was incorporated in 1861.

References

Unincorporated communities in Logan County, Kentucky
1861 establishments in Kentucky
Unincorporated communities in Kentucky
Populated places established in 1861